Golden grevillea is a common name for several plants in the genus Grevillea and may refer to:

Grevillea aurea, a shrub native to the Northern Territory in Australia
Grevillea chrysophaea, a shrub which is endemic to Victoria in Australia
Grevillea pteridifolia, a shrub native to Western Australia, Northern Territory and Queensland

Grevillea taxa by common name